The 1905 Delaware football team represented Delaware College—now known as the University of Delaware–as an independent during the 1905 college football season. Led by Nathan Mannakee in his third and final year as head coach, Delaware compiled a record of 3–4–1.

Schedule

References

Delaware
Delaware Fightin' Blue Hens football seasons
Delaware football